Next Time We Love is a 1936 American melodrama film directed by Edward H. Griffith and starring Margaret Sullavan, James Stewart and Ray Milland. The adapted screenplay was by Melville Baker, with an uncredited Preston Sturges and Doris Anderson, based on Ursula Parrott's 1935 novel Next Time We Live, which was serialized before publication as Say Goodbye Again. The film is also known as Next Time We Live in the U.K.

Plot
Aspiring actress Cicely Tyler (Margaret Sullavan) marries ambitious newsman Christopher Tyler (James Stewart), but their life together is interrupted when he is assigned to a good position in his newspaper's Rome bureau, and she stays behind, confiding to her rich secret admirer, Tommy Abbott (Ray Milland), that she is pregnant. Separations, reunions and reconciliations follow as Cicely and Christopher struggle to balance their romance and their careers.

Cast
 Margaret Sullavan as Cicely Hunt Tyler
 James Stewart as Christopher Tyler
 Ray Milland as Tommy Abbott (as Raymond Milland)
 Grant Mitchell as Michael Jennings
 Robert McWade as Frank Carteret
 Anna Demetrio as Madame Donato
 Ronnie Cosby as Kit (as Ronald Cosbey)

Production
Ursula Parrott was a popular novelist of the time, several of whose novels were turned into films, most prominently Ex-Wife which became the 1930 movie The Divorcee. The story which provided the source material for Next Time We Love was first serialized as Say Goodbye Again in McCall's from December 1934 to April 1935, and was then published as a novel called Next Time We Live, which was also the working title of the film. There was debate about what to call the movie, with studio executives concerned that a motion picture entitled Next Time We Live might be misinterpreted as being about reincarnation, while director Edward H. Griffith wanted to avoid losing the publicity value of using the novel's title. Although the film was released as Next Time We Love, the alternate title Next Time We Live was used for its British release.

Francis Lederer was originally cast for the part of Christopher Tyler, but was unavailable. Margaret Sullavan was responsible for suggesting her friend James Stewart might be borrowed from MGM for the part. Production on the film was delayed because Sullavan was shooting retakes for So Red the Rose,  but it began on 21 October 1935 and continued through 30 December.  Shooting began with only half the script written by Melville Baker, so three weeks into production, the studio put Doris Anderson on the project as well.  Some scenes in the film were directed in San Francisco by assistant director Ralph Slosser using doubles, and Slosser also directed some studio scenes as well.

Next Time We Love was released at the end of January 1936.

Accolades
The film was nominated for the American Film Institute's 2002 list AFI's 100 Years...100 Passions.

References

External links

1936 films
American romantic drama films
American black-and-white films
Universal Pictures films
1936 romantic drama films
Films scored by Franz Waxman
Films directed by Edward H. Griffith
Films based on American novels
Films based on works by Ursula Parrott
Melodrama films
1930s English-language films
1930s American films